Cindy Õunpuu (also Ounpuu; married name Yelle; born 11 November 1966) is a Canadian-Estonian swimmer.

She was born in Toronto, Canada. She is graduated from Florida University in Gainesville.

She started his swimming exercising already in youth, coached by Mai Kreem. In 1985 he won gold medal at 1985 Pan Pacific Swimming Championships. She is 5-times Canadian champion. 1983–1986 she was a member of Canadian national swimming team. She was also a reserve swimmer for Canadian team at 1984 Summer Olympics in Los Angeles.

In 1985 she was named as Best Female Swimmer of Canada.

References

Living people
1966 births
Estonian female swimmers
Canadian female swimmers
Swimmers from Toronto
Commonwealth Games silver medallists for Canada
Commonwealth Games medallists in swimming
Swimmers at the 1986 Commonwealth Games
Medallists at the 1986 Commonwealth Games